The Town Traveller is a 1898 novel by George Gissing. Known more for works of social realism, this novel marked a departure from that style from Gissing, and incidentally was his biggest commercial success.

References

External links
 
 

1898 British novels
Novels by George Gissing
Methuen Publishing books